Edgar Spriit (born 29 September 1922 in Vihula Parish, Virumaa – 8 August 1993 in Tallinn) was an Estonian journalist, satirist, editor and politician. He was a member of VII Riigikogu.

He was married to journalist Ester Spriit (née Tartu; 1923–2006) and dancer Elonna Spriit. His children are Sirje Piho, Eero Spriit, and Egon Spriit.

References

1922 births
1993 deaths
Estonian journalists
Estonian humorists
Estonian editors
Estonian male writers
20th-century Estonian writers
Members of the Riigikogu, 1992–1995
People from Haljala Parish
Soviet journalists
Burials at Pärnamäe Cemetery
Northwestern Management Institute alumni